Pimera Hora (First Hour) is a Spanish language newspaper published in Nuevo Laredo, Tamaulipas, Mexico. The newspaper was founded on October 24, 2001, by Benjamín Galván Gómez. The newspaper is printed daily at 10:00 AM CST to ensure the latest news is read and the newspaper is sold until 5:30 PM CST. Primera Hora is also circulated in Laredo, Texas, United States.

On September 25, 2011, Mexican police discovered the body of Marisol Macias Castaneda, an administrative manager for Primera Hora and online administrator for Nuevo Laredo En Vivo under the name NenaDLaredo, decapitated and accompanied by a note "attributed to a criminal group". Macias Castaneda's identity was confirmed by Primera Hora and by the Tamaulipas state secretary of the interior.  Some sources reported the dead journalist's identity as María Elizabeth Macias Castro.

See also
 List of newspapers in Mexico

References

External links
Primera Hora official website
Primera Hora Online Edition

Newspapers published in Mexico
Mass media in Nuevo Laredo